Salome Lang (born 18 November 1997) is a Swiss athlete who competes in the high jump.

From Basel where she is coached by Alan Wisslé, she studied business administration at the University of St. Gallen. Lang gained her first international experience at the 2013 European Youth Summer Olympic Festival (EYOF) in Utrecht where she finished in seventh place with a jump of 1.72m. The following year she competed at the 2014 Summer Youth Olympics where she reached fifth place with 1.73m jump. She took part in the 2015 European Athletics Junior Championships in Eskilstuna and finished 7th with a jump of 1.79m. She also finished 7th at the 2016 IAAF World U20 Championships in Bydgoszcz with a  height of 1.83m. She came fourth at the 2017 European Athletics U23 Championships again in Bydgoszcz with a jump of 1.86m. In 2020 she set a new Swiss indoor record with 1.94 m in St. Gallen which placed her joint 8th worldwide for the year. Lang has won multiple national titles; in 2014, 2015, 2017, 2019 and 2020, Lang was Swiss champion in the high jump outdoors, and in 2016 and from 2019, 2020, and 2021 also indoors.

On June 20, 2021 Lang cleared an Olympic qualifying standard and Swiss record of 1.96m, breaking by one centimeter the record held by Sieglinde Cadusch since 1995, at the European Team Championships First League in Cluj-Napoca. This secured her place at the delayed 2020 Tokyo Olympics.

References

1997 births
Living people
Swiss female high jumpers
Sportspeople from Basel-Stadt
Athletes (track and field) at the 2014 Summer Youth Olympics
Athletes (track and field) at the 2020 Summer Olympics
Olympic athletes of Switzerland
21st-century Swiss women